Timothy Plough (born June 24, 1985) is an American football coach and former player who is currently the tight ends coach for the University of California, Berkeley. A former quarterback at the University of California, Davis, he is considered to be one of the rising assistant coaches in college football, having received a "35 under 35" award from the American Football Coaches Association (AFCA) in 2019.

Playing career 
Plough was a quarterback at UC Davis from 2003 to 2007, appearing in only 16 games due to a number of injuries he suffered throughout his college career.

Coaching career 
Plough began his coaching career at his alma mater UC Davis as a student assistant in 2008 before being elevated to quarterbacks coach in 2009. He added the title of passing game coordinator in 2010, and was given offensive play-calling duties at the age of 25. Plough spent three seasons with the Aggies before departing for Northern Arizona in 2013 to be the Lumberjacks' wide receivers coach. He was promoted to offensive coordinator and reassigned to quarterbacks coach in 2015, where the Lumberjacks led the nation in quarterback efficiency as their starter Case Cookus won the STATS FCS Freshman Player of the Year award. Plough left Northern Arizona to return to UC Davis in 2017 as their offensive coordinator and quarterbacks coach, where the Aggies had a top 10 passing offense in all three of the seasons in which Plough was offensive coordinator.

Plough was named the offensive coordinator at Boise State in 2021.  Plough was fired from his position on September 24, 2022 by Boise State head coach Andy Avalos. Dirk Koetter replaced him. Plough was hired as a tight end coach at California on December 12, 2022.

References

External links 
 
 California Golden Bears profile
 Boise State Broncos profile
 UC Davis Aggies profile

1985 births
Living people
Players of American football from San Diego
Coaches of American football from California
American football quarterbacks
UC Davis Aggies football players
UC Davis Aggies football coaches
Northern Arizona Lumberjacks football coaches
Boise State Broncos football coaches
California Golden Bears football coaches